North Puyallup is a census-designated place located in Pierce County, Washington. It sits on the north bank of the Puyallup River.

Demographics

As of the 2020 census, North Puyallup had 1,837 people, and 915 households. The population is 77.3% White, 1.4% African Americans, 1.9% Native American, 2.9% Asian Americans, 1.7% Native Hawaiians or Pacific Islander, 4.0% other races, and 8.9% two or more races.

Geography
North Puyallup is located at coordinates 47°12′05″N 122°16′30″W.

References

Census-designated places in Pierce County, Washington